Las Cabras may refer to:
Las Cabras, Chile
Las Cabras, Herrera, Panama